The 20th annual Australian Recording Industry Association Music Awards (generally known as ARIA Music Awards or simply The ARIAS) were held on 29 October 2006 at the Acer Arena at the Sydney Olympic Park complex. Presenters on the night included James Mathison, Johnny Knoxville, Jesse McCartney and John Mayer.

Axle Whitehead controversy
Video Hits host Axle Whitehead exposed himself and simulated masturbation on an ARIA trophy as the winners of the awards for Highest Selling Single and Highest Selling Album made their way to the stage in front of an audience of up to 10,000. The incident was edited from the telecast of the awards. Whitehead announced three days after the awards that he had resigned from Network Ten.

Awards and nominations
Winners are highlighted in bold, other final nominees shown in plain.

ARIA Awards
Album of the Year
Bernard Fanning – Tea and Sympathy
Augie March – Moo, You Bloody Choir
Eskimo Joe – Black Fingernails, Red Wine  
The Sleepy Jackson – Personality – One Was a Spider, One Was a Bird
Wolfmother – Wolfmother 
Single of the Year
Eskimo Joe – "Black Fingernails, Red Wine"
Augie March – "One Crowded Hour"
Bernard Fanning – "Watch Over Me"
Wolfmother – "Mind's Eye"
Youth Group – "Forever Young"
Best Female Artist
Clare Bowditch – What Was Left
Holly Throsby – Under the Town 
Jade MacRae – Jade MacRae 
Jen Cloher – Dead Wood Falls 
Kasey Chambers – "Nothing at All"
Best Male Artist
Bernard Fanning – Tea and Sympathy
Ben Lee – "We're All in This Together" 
Bob Evans – Suburban Songbook 
Dan Kelly & the Alpha Males – Pirate Radio 
Pete Murray – See the Sun
Best Group
Wolfmother – Wolfmother
Augie March – Moo, You Bloody Choir 
Eskimo Joe – Black Fingernails, Red Wine 
Rogue Traders – Here Come the Drums 
The Living End – State of Emergency 
Highest Selling Album
Human Nature – Reach Out: The Motown Record
Bernard Fanning – Tea and Sympathy
Pete Murray – See the Sun
Rogue Traders – Here Come the Drums
The Veronicas – The Secret Life Of...
Highest Selling Single
TV Rock featuring Seany B – "Flaunt It"
Kate DeAraugo – "Maybe Tonight"
Lee Harding – "Wasabi"
Shannon Noll – "Shine"
Youth Group – "Forever Young"
Best Breakthrough Artist – Album
Wolfmother – Wolfmother
Hilltop Hoods – The Hard Road
Rogue Traders – Here Come the Drums
The Grates – Gravity Won't Get You High
The Veronicas – The Secret Life Of...
Breakthrough Artist – Single
Youth Group – "Forever Young"
Gyroscope – "Fast Girl"
Hilltop Hoods – "Clown Prince"
Sneaky Sound System – "I Love It"
TV Rock featuring Seany B – "Flaunt It"
Starky – "Hey Bang Bang"
Best Adult Contemporary Album
Bob Evans – Suburban Songbook
Human Nature  – Reach Out: The Motown Record
Tex, Don and Charlie – All Is Forgiven
The Whitlams – Little Cloud
Various Artists – She Will Have Her Way: The Songs of Tim & Neil Finn
Best Blues & Roots Album
The Audreys – Between Last Night and Us
Bernard Fanning – Tea and Sympathy 
Lior – Doorways of My Mind 
The Flood – The Late Late Show 
Xavier Rudd – Food in the Belly
Best Children's Album
The Wiggles – Racing to the Rainbow
Hi-5 – Wish Upon a Star
Justine Clarke – I Like to Sing! 
The Fairies – Fairy Magic 
The Hooley Dooleys - Smile
Best Comedy Release
Lano and Woodley – Sing Songs
Carl Barron – Whatever Comes Next DVD 
Matt Tilley – Cereal Pest 
The Shambles – Best of Series One & Two
Best Country Album
Troy Cassar-Daley – Brighter Day
Adam Brand – What a Life
Anne Kirkpatrick – Showman's Daughter 
Catherine Britt – Too Far Gone 
Lee Kernaghan – The New Bush 
Best Dance Release
TV Rock featuring Seany B – Flaunt It
Dirty South – Dirty South EP
Paul Mac – Panic Room
Sneaky Sound System – "I Love It"
The Presets – Beams
Best Independent Release
Hilltop Hoods – The Hard Road
Ben Lee – "We're All in This Together"
Gotye – Like Drawing Blood
The John Butler Trio – Live at St. Gallen
Lior – Doorways of My Mind
Best Music DVD
Eskimo Joe – Eskimo Joe
Hilltop Hoods – The Calling Live 
Kylie Minogue – Showgirl: The Greatest Hits Tour 
Missy Higgins – If You Tell Me Yours, I'll Tell You Mine 
The Go-Betweens – That Striped Sunlight Sound
Best Pop Release
The Veronicas – The Secret Life of...
Ben Lee – Into the Dark EP
Josh Pyke – Feeding the Wolves
Rogue Traders – Here Come the Drums
Shannon Noll – Lift
Best Rock Album
Wolfmother – Wolfmother
Augie March – Moo, You Bloody Choir
Eskimo Joe – Black Fingernails, Red Wine
The Living End – State of Emergency
You Am I – Convicts
Best Urban Release
Hilltop Hoods – The Hard Road
Bliss n Eso – "Up Jumped the Boogie" 
Jade MacRae – Jade MacRae 
Phrase – Talk with Force 
Weapon X & Ken Hell – Sneakerpimpin' Ain't Easy

Artisan Awards
Best Cover Art
Debaser – Bernard Fanning - Tea and Sympathy
Alison Smith, Chris Cheney – The Living End – State of Emergency
Dane Lovett, Dave Snow – Eskimo Joe – Black Fingernails, Red Wine
Luke Steele, James Bellesini, Love Police – The Sleepy Jackson - Personality – One Was a Spider, One Was a Bird
The Grates – The Grates – Gravity Won't Get You High
Best Video
Head Pictures – Bernard Fanning – "Wish You Well"
Andy Cassell – Youth Group – "Forever Young"
Bart Borghessi – Eskimo Joe – "Black Fingernails, Red Wine"
Kim Moyes – The Presets – "Are You the One"
Sean Gilligan, Sarah-Jane Woulahan – The Living End – "Wake Up"
Engineer of the Year
Matt Lovell – Eskimo Joe – Black Fingernails, Red Wine
Adam Rhodes – The Cat Empire – Cities: The Cat Empire Project
Nick Launay – The Living End – State of Emergency
Paul McKercher – Augie March – various tracks on Moo, You Bloody Choir
Wayne Connolly – The Vines – Vision Valley
Producer of the Year
Eskimo Joe – Eskimo Joe– Black Fingernails, Red Wine
Lindsay Gravina, Magic Dirt – Magic Dirt – Snow White
Nick Launay – The Living End – State of Emergency
Paul McKercher – Augie March – various tracks on Moo, You Bloody Choir
Wayne Connolly – Youth Group – Casino Twilight Dogs

Fine Arts Awards
Best Classical Album
Richard Tognetti – Bach Sonatas and Partitas for Solo Violin
Amelia Farrugia – Joie De Vivre
Nikki Vaskilakis, Tasmanian Symphony Orchestra, Sebastian Lang-Lessing – Mendelssohn, Bruch, Ravel
Simon Tedeschi, The Queensland Orchestra, Richard Bonynge – Piano Concertos: Tchaikovsky, Grieg
Slava Grigoryan, Leonard Grigoryan – The Queensland Orchestra – Brett Kelly – Rodrigo Guitar Concertos
Best Jazz Album
The Necks – Chemist
Don Burrows, The Mell-O-Tones, Phillip Sametz – Non-Stop Flight – Great Music of the Swing Era
James Muller – Kaboom
Mark Sholtez – Real Street
Paul Grabowsky, Bernie McGann – Always 
Best Soundtrack / Cast / Show Recording
Paul Kelly, Dan Luscombe, Katie Brianna & the Stormwater Boys – Jindabyne Soundtrack
David Bridie – RAN Soundtrack 
Francois Tetaz – Wolf Creek Original Motion Picture Soundtrack 
Nick Cave, Warren Ellis – The Proposition 
Various – Little Fish Soundtrack
Best World Music Album
The Cat Empire – Cities: The Cat Empire Project
Joseph and James Tawadros – Visions 
Mara! – Sorella 
The Pigram Brothers – Under the Mango Tree 
Seaman Dan – Island Way

Hall of Fame inductees
The following artists were inducted into the ARIA Hall of Fame on 16 August 2006, which was broadcast on 20 August:
Daddy Cool inducted by singer-songwriter, Tim Finn
Divinyls inducted by actor, Hugh Jackman
Icehouse inducted by singer-songwriter, Tim Freedman
Lobby Loyde inducted by bandmate, Billy Thorpe 
Helen Reddy inducted by actor, Toni Collette
Rose Tattoo inducted by musician, Sarah McLeod
Inducted on 29 October:
Midnight Oil inducted by Irish singer-songwriter, Bono

Performers
The following artists performed on stage during the 2006 ARIA Awards:
Wolfmother
Eskimo Joe
The Veronicas 
Human Nature
Hilltop Hoods
Silverchair
Youth Group
Pete Murray (featuring John Mayer)
Bernard Fanning (featuring Kasey Chambers and Clare Bowditch)

Channel V Oz Artist of the Year award
Channel V Oz Artist of the Year
Wolfmother
Eskimo Joe 
Rogue Traders
The Veronicas

See also
Australian music
Australian rock

References

ARIA Music Awards
2006 in Australian music
2006 music awards